Caleb Johnson (born July 28, 1998) is an American football middle linebacker for the Jacksonville Jaguars of the National Football League (NFL). He played college football at Houston Baptist.

College career
Johnson played for the Houston Baptist Huskies for four seasons. As a senior, he recorded 49 tackles in four games in a shortened season after the Southland Conference fall football season was canceled due to the COVID-19 pandemic and was named the co-Defensive Player of the Year for the conference. He finished his collegiate career with 278 tackles, 27 tackles for loss, 10.0 sacks and seven fumble recoveries.

Professional career

Chicago Bears
Johnson signed with the Chicago Bears as an undrafted free agent on May 14, 2021. He was the first Houston Baptist player to sign an NFL contract and made the 53-man roster out of training camp.

On August 31, 2022, Johnson was waived by the Bears.

Jacksonville Jaguars
On September 1, 2022, Johnson was claimed off waivers by the Jacksonville Jaguars.

References

External links
Chicago Bears bio
Houston Baptist Huskies bio

1998 births
Living people
American football linebackers
Chicago Bears players
Houston Christian Huskies football players
Players of American football from San Diego
Jacksonville Jaguars players